Ordinary Fellows is a 2019 Nigerian coming-of-age drama film directed by Lorenzo Menakaya and Ikenna Aniekwe. It stars Wale Ojo, Ken Erics, Chiwetalu Agu and Somadina Adinma. It’s a story of Youth and Restlessness, set against the back-drop of Nigerian academia and African myths. It had its world premiere in Detroit, Michigan on 17 August 2019, at the African World Film Festival, where it was recognized as Best Direction. It had its African premiere on 28 September 2019 at the Lights, Camera, Africa! Film Festival in Lagos, Nigeria.

Cast 

 Wale Ojo as Professor Jega
 Somadina Adinma as DJ Cash
 Oluchi Amajuoyi as Ify
 Chiwetalu Agu as Mr. Mgbu
 Ezinna Offor as Geraldine
 Ken Erics as Ekene
 Martins "MC4God" Neboh as Boogie
 Chen Emmanuel as Gozie
 Diamond Okoh as Ada
 Vivian Nwabueze as Dilichukwu
 Nnamdi Agbo as Cee Jay
 Uzoamaka Onuoha as Efya
 Nnamdi Kanaga as Nnamdi

Awards

References 

2010s coming-of-age drama films
English-language Nigerian films
2019 drama films
Nigerian coming-of-age films
2010s English-language films